Cambria Historic District is a national historic district located at Christiansburg, Montgomery County, Virginia.  The district encompasses 34 contributing buildings in the town of Christiansburg. It includes a variety of commercial, residential, and institutional buildings related to Cambria's historical role as the "port" for the nearby town of Christiansburg.  The residences are reflective of a variety of popular architectural styles, in including Colonial Revival and Queen Anne. Notable buildings include the Surface-Lee Block, Dew Drop Inn, Epperly Pontiac dealership, Cambria Hardware Company Building, Palmer Store, Lee House, Cambria Baptist Church (1928), and the New Christiansburg Depot (1906). The Cambria Freight Station is located in the district and listed separately.

It was listed on the National Register of Historic Places in 1991.

References

External links
New River Heritage Coalition: Cambria Depot Museum

Historic districts in Montgomery County, Virginia
Queen Anne architecture in Virginia
Colonial Revival architecture in Virginia
National Register of Historic Places in Montgomery County, Virginia
Historic districts on the National Register of Historic Places in Virginia